Istiqlol is a city in Sughd Region, northern Tajikistan. 

Istiqlol may also refer to other places in Tajikistan:
Istiqlol, Devashtich District, in Devashtich District
Istiqlol, Jayhun District, in Jayhun District
Istiqlol, Spitamen, in Spitamen District
Istiqlol, Shahrinav District, in Shahrinav District
Istiqlol, Shahriston District, in Shahriston District
Sarvati Istiqlol, in Kushoniyon District